Sadağı Canyon Nature Park is a nature park declared canyon in Bursa, Turkey.

The canyon is located at Sadağı village of Orhaneli district in Bursa Province.

In 2013, the canyon area was declared a nature park by the Ministry of Environment and Forest. The nature park's operation was left to the Municipality of Orhaneli for a term of five years in 2015.

References

Canyons and gorges of Turkey
Landforms of Bursa Province
Nature parks in Turkey
Protected areas established in 2013
2013 establishments in Turkey
Tourist attractions in Bursa Province
Orhaneli District